The San Diego Fighter Wing is a disbanded United States Air Force unit.  The wing provided air defense of southern California and trained fighter units and pilots.  It was stationed at San Diego, California, where it was disbanded on 7 June 1944.

History
To carry out this mission, Fourth Air Force organized regional air defense wings in August 1942. Only one squadron of Army Air Forces fighters were attached to the wing, with most tactical elements drawn from the Navy.

Lineage
 Constituted as the San Diego Air Defense Wing on 6 August 1942
 Activated on 11 August 1942
 Redesignated San Diego Fighter Wing in July 1943
 Disbanded on 7 June 1944

Assignments
 IV Fighter Command, 11 August 1942
 Fourth Air Force, 31 March 1944 – 7 June 1944

Stations
 San Diego, California, 20 August 1942 – 7 June 1944

References

Notes
 Explanatory notes

 Citations

Bibliography

 
 
 
 

Fighter wings of the United States Army Air Forces
Military units and formations disestablished in 1944